Young at Heart may refer to:

Music 
 "Young at Heart" (Frank Sinatra song), a 1953 pop standard written by Johnny Richards and Carolyn Leigh, covered by many performers
 "Young at Heart" (Amy Meredith song)
 "Young at Heart" (Bananarama song), also covered by The Bluebells
 Young at Heart (Doris Day and Frank Sinatra album), a soundtrack album from the 1954 film
 Young at Heart (Howard McGhee and Teddy Edwards album), a 1979 jazz album
 Young at Heart (James Young album), a 1966 comedy album
 Young at Heart, a 1960 album by Ray Conniff
 Young at Heart/Wise in Time, a 1974 album by Muhal Richard Abrams
 Young@Heart, an American chorus group

Film 
 Young at Heart (1954 film), a film starring Frank Sinatra and Doris Day
 Young at Heart (1987 film), a film that received an Academy Award for Documentary Short Subject
 Young at Heart (1995 film), a television movie starring Olympia Dukakis
 Young@Heart (film), a 2008 documentary film about the group Young@Heart

Television 
 "Young at Heart" (2point4 children), an episode of 2point4 children
 "Young at Heart" (American Dragon: Jake Long), an episode of American Dragon: Jake Long
 "Young at Heart" (The Honeymooners), an episode of The Honeymooners
 "Young at Heart" (The X-Files), an episode of The X-Files
 Young at Heart (1960 TV series), a UK music television series presented by Jimmy Savile
 Young at Heart (1980 TV series), a UK sitcom starring John Mills